Wilfried Sauerland (born 29 February 1940 in Wuppertal) is a German boxing promoter and manager.  He was inducted into the International Boxing Hall of Fame in 2010.

Career
Boxing camps associated with Sauerland, have had various locations:

Frankfurt (Oder) with Manfred Wolke and Rudi Fink (2003), Cologne with Ulli Wegner (1996–2004), and in Berlin with Ulli Wegner, since 2004.His sons now run the boxing promotional business.

Current boxers

Previous boxers

 Arthur Abraham
 Ahmad Kaddour
 Alejandro Berrio
 Alexander Frenkel
 Alexander Povetkin
 Axel Schulz
 Cecilia Brækhus
 Chisanda Mutti
 David Graf
 David Haye
 Dustin Dirks
 Edmund Gerber
 Eduard Gutknecht
 Enad Licina
 Francesco Pianeta
 Henry Akinwande
 Henry Maske
 Jack Culcay
 John Mugabi
 Karo Murat
 Marco Huck
 Markus Beyer
 Mikkel Kessler
 Nikolai Valuev
 Oktay Urkal
 Oleh Platov
 Robert Helenius
 Ruediger May
 Sebastian Sylvester
 Steve Cunningham
 Sven Ottke
 Timo Hoffmann
 Torsten May
 Tyron Zeuge
 Yoan Pablo Hernandez
 Željko Mavrović
 George Groves
 Enrico Kölling
 Artur Mann
 Kubrat Pulev
 Patrick Nielsen
 Anthony Ogogo
 Noel Gevor
 Mikaela Laurén
 Otto Wallin
 Michael Wallisch
 Oscar Ahlin
 Stefan Härtel
 Tomi Honka
 Oliver Flodin
 Mikkel Nielsen
 Abdul Khattab
 Dennis Ceylan
 Tim-Robin Lihaug
 Burak Sahin
 Araik Marutjan
 Micki Nielsen
 Anthony Yigit
 Nieky Holzken
 Klara Svensson
 Hadi Srour
 Albon Pervizaj
 Mikael Lawal
 Frederik Hede Jensen
 Zach Parker
 Dina Thorslund
 Kem Ljungquist

References

External links
Biography in German

1940 births
Living people
Boxing promoters
Sportspeople from Wuppertal
International Boxing Hall of Fame inductees